Chrysotimus is a genus of longlegged flies in the family Dolichopodidae. It is cosmopolitan in distribution, but it is probably paraphyletic with respect to several genera of limited distribution (such as Alishanimyia).

Species

Chrysotimus acutatus Wang, Yang & Grootaert, 2005
Chrysotimus alacer Parent, 1932
Chrysotimus alipes Parent, 1932
Chrysotimus alumnus Parent, 1932
Chrysotimus ambiguus Parent, 1932
Chrysotimus amoenus Parent, 1932
Chrysotimus ancistrus Yang, Saigusa & Masunaga, 2008
Chrysotimus apicicurvatus Yang, 2002
Chrysotimus arizonicus Robinson, 1967
Chrysotimus basiflavus Yang, 2002
Chrysotimus beijingensis (Yang & Saigusa, 2001)
Chrysotimus bifascia Yang & Saigusa, 2005
Chrysotimus bifurcatus Wang & Yang, 2006
Chrysotimus bilineatus Parent, 1933
Chrysotimus bispinus Yang & Saigusa, 2001
Chrysotimus blandus Parent, 1934
Chrysotimus calcaneatus Parent, 1932
Chrysotimus chikuni Wang, Yang & Grootaert, 2005
Chrysotimus confraternus Van Duzee, 1930
Chrysotimus curvispinus Yang, Saigusa & Masunaga, 2008
Chrysotimus dalongensis Wang, Chen & Yang, 2012
Chrysotimus delicatus Loew, 1861
Chrysotimus dichromatus (Bigot, 1890)
Chrysotimus digitatus Yang & Saigusa, 2001
Chrysotimus digitiformis Yang, Saigusa & Masunaga, 2008
Chrysotimus dorsalis Yang, 2002
Chrysotimus exilis (Philippi, 1865)
Chrysotimus flavicornis Van Duzee, 1916
Chrysotimus flavisetus Negrobov, 1978
Chrysotimus flaviventris (Roser, 1840)
Chrysotimus furcatus Yang, Saigusa & Masunaga, 2008
Chrysotimus grandis Wang & Yang, 2006
Chrysotimus guangdongensis Wang, Yang & Grootaert, 2005
Chrysotimus guangxiensis Yang & Saigusa, 2001
Chrysotimus huairouensis Wang, Chen & Yang, 2012
Chrysotimus hubeiensis Wang, Chen & Yang, 2012
Chrysotimus incisus Yang & Saigusa, 2001
Chrysotimus javanensis Hollis, 1964
Chrysotimus lii Wang & Yang, 2006
Chrysotimus lijianganus Yang & Saigusa, 2001
Chrysotimus linzhiensis Wang & Yang, 2006
Chrysotimus lucens Parent, 1932
Chrysotimus lunulatus Parent, 1933
Chrysotimus luteolus Parent, 1932
Chrysotimus luteopalpus Curran, 1923
Chrysotimus luteus Curran, 1930
Chrysotimus meridionalis Naglis & Bartak, 2015
Chrysotimus metallicus Parent, 1934
Chrysotimus molliculoides Parent, 1937
Chrysotimus molliculus (Fallén, 1823)
Chrysotimus motuoensis Wang, Chen & Yang, 2014
Chrysotimus nepalensis Yang, Saigusa & Masunaga, 2008
Chrysotimus nigrichaetus (Parent, 1933)
Chrysotimus ningxianus Wang, Yang & Grootaert, 2005
Chrysotimus obscurus Robinson, 1967
Chrysotimus occdentalis (Harmston, 1951)
Chrysotimus pingbianus Yang & Saigusa, 2001
Chrysotimus pusio Loew, 1861
Chrysotimus qinlingensis Yang & Saigusa, 2005
Chrysotimus repertus Parent, 1932
Chrysotimus sanjiangyuanus Wang, Yang & Grootaert, 2005
Chrysotimus schildi Robinson, 1967
Chrysotimus scutatus Parent, 1933
Chrysotimus setosus Yang & Saigusa, 2005
Chrysotimus shennonjianus Yang & Saigusa, 2001
Chrysotimus sinensis Parent, 1944
Chrysotimus songshanus Wang, Yang & Grootaert, 2005
Chrysotimus spinuliferus Negrobov, 1978
Chrysotimus sugonjaevi Negrobov, 1978
Chrysotimus taiwanensis Wang, Chen & Yang, 2015
Chrysotimus tibetensis Wang, Chen & Yang, 2014
Chrysotimus unifascia Yang & Saigusa, 2005
Chrysotimus varicoloris Becker, 1908
Chrysotimus xiaohuangshanus Wang, Yang & Grootaert, 2005
Chrysotimus xiaolongmensis Zhang, Yang & Grootaert, 2003
Chrysotimus xuae Wang, Yang & Grootaert, 2005
Chrysotimus xuankuni Wang, Chen & Yang, 2014
Chrysotimus yunlonganus Yang & Saigusa, 2001
Chrysotimus zhui Wang, Chen & Yang, 2014

The following species are currently placed in Guzeriplia, if it is considered a separate genus:
Chrysotimus beijingensis (Yang & Saigusa, 2001)
Chrysotimus chlorinus (Negrobov, 1968)
Chrysotimus viridanus (Negrobov, 1978)

References

Further reading

External links

 

Dolichopodidae genera
Peloropeodinae
Articles containing video clips
Diptera of Europe
Diptera of Asia
Diptera of Australasia
Diptera of North America
Diptera of South America
Taxa named by Hermann Loew